Thomas Lowe Hughes (December 11, 1925 – January 2, 2023) was an American government official who was the Director of the Bureau of Intelligence and Research during the Kennedy and Johnson administrations. From 1971 he was President of the Carnegie Endowment for International Peace. He was also counsel to Minnesota Senator Hubert Humphrey from 1955 to 1958.

Born in Mankato, Minnesota, on December 11, 1925, Hughes was educated at Carleton College, Minnesota, Oxford University, as a Rhodes Scholar, and Yale Law School, graduating in 1952.

Hughes died in Washington D.C., on January 2, 2023, at the age of 97.

References
3. Smith, Bruce. 2022. The Last Gentleman: Thomas Hughes and the end of the American Century. Brookings Institution, 978-0-8157-3890-9.

1925 births
2023 deaths
American Rhodes Scholars
Carnegie Endowment for International Peace
Yale Law School alumni
People from Mankato, Minnesota